Whitelines is an English language magazine covering snowboarding culture published by Factory Media.

History
Founded in 1995, Whitelines began publishing under Jim Peskett, owner of Permanent Publishing, with former British professional snowboarder Tudor ‘Chod’ Thomas as editor. Its sister skateboarding magazine, Sidewalk Surfer (now Sidewalk) shared the same office in Abingdon, Oxfordshire. They were later joined by The Surfer's Path and Dig BMX.

The magazine's name, which plays on freeride snowboarding and drugs culture, was originally spelt out as two words (White Lines). Over the years - for the sake of a simpler logo and the website URL - it has merged to become Whitelines.

At the time of its launch, the only other British snowboard magazine on the shelves was Snowboard UK. Initially something of a fanzine, Whitelines targeted a core readership, differentiating itself from the competition through its forthright opinions and an irreverent sense of humour. Early articles included ‘Freak Speak’ (in which the editor interviewed Oxford's local tramps), a tour of the UK's best rollercoasters and an in depth tutorial on ‘How to drive like The Sweeney’. Tudor ‘Chod’ Thomas now admits that these were partly included for lack of actual snowboarding photos.

The first issue of Whitelines was published in October 1995 and featured Burton-sponsored British snowboarder Chris Moran on the cover. Moran later went on to become one of the magazine's editors, alongside Matt Barr, before the two of them left to found the ACM writing group, which still contributes regular articles to the magazine.

The current editor, Ed Blomfield, joined in 2005, and is assisted by Andrew Duthie. Chod, who by this time focused solely on graphic design, left the magazine in 2007. Other members of the Whitelines editorial team have included the BBC’s Ski Sunday presenter Ed Leigh and photographer James McPhail. Whitelines is also credited with kick-starting the photographic career of Nick Hamilton, who worked as a staffer at Permanent Publishing alongside skate lensman Wig Worland before leaving Whitelines to become photo editor at Transworld Snowboarding.

Over the years Whitelines has developed from its early fanzine style to a respected snowboard journal, and regularly features the work of some of the best international snowboard photographers, including Jeff Curtes, Blotto, Andy Wright and Scott Serfas. Regular columnists have included pro snowboarders Devun Walsh and David Benedek. In 2005, Benedek chose a cover-mounted DVD on Whitelines as the means to distribute his acclaimed film, ‘91 Words for Snow’, in the UK.

Whitelines has helped spawn the careers of many of Britain's professional snowboarders, such as Danny Wheeler, Tyler Chorlton, Jenny Jones, Dan Wakeham, Scott McMorris, Dom Harington, Ben Kilner and Jamie Nicholls. It has also taken riders to many unusual snowboarding destinations, including Greenland, the Lebanon, Iran, Russia, Uzbekistan, and Kashmir.

In 2007, the magazine joined Factory Media as part of the merger of three leading specialist sports publishers: Action Sports Media (ASM),  Permanent Publishing and 4130 Publishing. It was based in Farringdon, London.

Final Issue*
The final issue of Whitelines was the March 2015 version (#120). At the time of Ed Blomfield leaving the magazine it was expected to continue in print, however the owners Factory Media announced in the summer of 2015 that print production would cease and they would live on in digital format via the whitelines.com website. *Under the new management of Any Day Media print publication resumed, again under Ed's direction, resulting in the annual issues; 121 & 122.

Awards
In 2007 Ed Blomfield was named New Editor of the Year at the PTC New Journalist Awards.

In 2010 Whitelines won ‘Best Cover’ in the sports category of the Maggies Awards. The winning cover, from issue 82, was shot in Iceland and featured British snowboarder Colum Mytton. It was designed by former WL art director Nick Butterfield.

New Media
Whitelines magazine's website, whitelines.com, is a growing as a part of the Whitelines brand and focuses on snowboarding news, videos and competitions. Whitelines.com is part of the Mpora network, which is shared between all of the Factory Media titles. Whitelines also sends out a popular and much imitated newsletter, the Friday Fix, to subscribers. The weekly email includes snowboarding news, video links and a desktop wallpaper.

References

External links 
 Whitelines Magazine

1995 establishments in the United Kingdom
2015 disestablishments in the United Kingdom
Defunct magazines published in the United Kingdom
Magazines established in 1995
Magazines disestablished in 2015
Magazines published in London
Online magazines published in the United Kingdom
Online magazines with defunct print editions
Snowboarding magazines
Sports magazines published in the United Kingdom